Willem Alberda van Ekenstein (March 28, 1858 – May 5, 1937) was a Dutch chemist and discovered the Lobry de Bruyn–van Ekenstein transformation together with Adriaan Lobry van Troostenburg de Bruyn.

Ekenstein studied chemistry from 1876 till 1879 at the Delft University of Technology later he worked at the University of Amsterdam, University of Groningen, Dutch National Sugar Laboratory in Amsterdam.

References
 short Biography 

1858 births
1937 deaths
20th-century Dutch chemists
Academic staff of the University of Amsterdam
Academic staff of the University of Groningen
Scientists  from Groningen (city)
Delft University of Technology alumni
19th-century Dutch chemists